John A. Graham (December 3, 1911 – December 3, 1979) was an American politician and businessman who served as a member of the Illinois Senate from 1958 to 1979.

Early life and education 
Graham was born on a farm near Irving, Illinois and attended local public schools. He graduated from Fillmore High School in 1928. He later attended business and technical schools.

Career 
Graham began his career as an accountant. He served in the United States Army Air Forces during World War II and was commissioned a sergeant. Graham, his wife, and family lived in Barrington, Illinois where he owned an appliance business. Graham served in the Illinois Senate from 1958 until his death in 1979 and was a Republican.

Personal life 
Graham died in Barrington, Illinois at his home.

Notes

1911 births
1979 deaths
People from Barrington, Illinois
People from Irving, Illinois
Businesspeople from Illinois
United States Army Air Forces officers
Military personnel from Illinois
Republican Party Illinois state senators
20th-century American politicians
20th-century American businesspeople